Peter George Hemingway (1929 – May 15, 1995) was a British architect who practiced    mainly in Canada and designed many public works including the Muttart Conservatory and the Central Pentecostal Tabernacle.

Biography
Hemingway was born in Minster, Kent and after gaining a diploma from Rochester Technical College he emigrated to Canada in 1955.  Serving briefly in the Alberta Department of Public Works, Hemingway founded his own practice in 1956. Hemingway won the Massey medal twice for his architecture projects.
He died on May 15, 1995.

Projects
Hemingway designed and was awarded the Massey Medal for the Stanley Engineering Building (1968) and the Peter Hemingway Fitness and Leisure Centre (1968-1970), which was formerly known as Coronation Pool and renamed after the architect in 2007. However, his most well-known and recognizable building is probably the Muttart Conservatory, a group of pyramid-shaped greenhouses in the Edmonton river valley.  He was also the architect of the Central Pentecostal Tabernacle in Central Edmonton which was demolished in 2007 despite attempts for it to be given protective status. In 1982 he served as President of the Alberta Association of Architects.  He was a frequent contributor to professional publications.

Projects include:
Stanley Engineering Building (1968)
Coronation Pool (1970); now Peter Hemingway Fitness and Leisure Centre 
Central Pentecostal Tabernacle (1972)
Strathcona County Fire Department Station 1 (1975)
Muttart Conservatory (1976)
Yellowknife Court House
St. Peter Evangelical Lutheran Church
RCMP building or Hemingway Centre

References

External links
 Peter Hemingway in the Canadian Encyclopedia

1929 births
1995 deaths
20th-century Canadian architects
People from Minster, Swale
People from Edmonton
English emigrants to Canada